Hilal-e-Kashmir (abbreviated as "HK") is the highest military gallantry award of Azad Jammu & Kashmir.

Recipient

 Naik Saif Ali Janjua (1923–1948)

See also
Nishan-e-Haider

Military awards and decorations of Pakistan
Hilal...........